S.O.Z. Soldados o Zombies (English: S.O.Z. Soldiers or Zombies) is a Mexican horror fiction streaming television series created by Nicolas Entel, and Miguel Tejada Flores. The first season consists of 8 episodes and is scheduled to premiere in 2020 on Amazon Prime Video. The series is produced by Dynamo and Red Creek Productions, and is stars Sergio Peris-Mencheta, Fátima Molina, Horacio García Rojas, Nery Arredondo, and Adria Morales.

Plot 
The plot revolves around the legendary drug trafficker Alonso Marroquín (Sergio Peris-Mencheta), who, with his son Lucas (Nery Arredondo) escapes from a high-security Mexican prison and finds refuge in Paradiso, a remote drug rehabilitation facility located on the American side of the border. Meanwhile, the bodies of experimental piglets, who were victims of a failed military experiment by the U.S., are abandoned near the border, and then revived as mutant zombies. In the search for Alonso and his son, the Mexican special forces team is infected by mutant zombies, becoming a zombie army. Alerted by the imminent threat that this new species represents for humanity, the United States Army embarks on a mission to annihilate them.

Cast 
  Sergio Peris-Mencheta as Alonso Marroquín
 Nery Arredondo as Lucas
 Fátima Molina
 Horacio García Rojas
 Adria Morales

References 

2021 Mexican television series debuts
Spanish-language television shows
Spanish-language Amazon Prime Video original programming
Amazon Prime Video original programming
Mexican horror fiction television series